Wesley Douglas is a South African politician.  He was a Member of parliament for the African Christian Democratic Party in the Parliament of South Africa from 2007 until 2009, but joined the African National Congress in 2013.

References 

Living people
Place of birth missing (living people)
Year of birth missing (living people)
African Christian Democratic Party politicians
African National Congress politicians
Members of the National Assembly of South Africa